Metarctia dracoena is a moth of the subfamily Arctiinae. It was described by Sergius G. Kiriakoff in 1953. It is found in the Democratic Republic of the Congo, South Africa and Tanzania.

References

Metarctia
Moths described in 1953